Parapercis colemani is a fish species in the sandperch family, Pinguipedidae. It is found at Norfolk Island..

Etymology
The fish is named in honor of Neville Coleman (1938-2012), an environmental photographer, an explorer and a conservationist, who discovered and photographed this species in 1989.

References

Pinguipedidae
Taxa named by John Ernest Randall
Fish described in 1993